The Coalition Party is a name used by more than one political party, including:

 Estonia: Estonian Coalition Party (Eesti Koonderakond), defunct
 Finland: National Coalition Party (Kansallinen Kokoomus or Samlingspartiet)
 Sweden: Moderate Coalition Party (Moderata samlingspartiet)
 Norway: Coalition Party (Norway) (Samlingspartiet) 
 Kosovo: Coalition Party (Kosovo)

See also
 Party coalition, a political coalition